Koryfi may refer to several places in Greece:

 Koryfi, Imathia, settlement in the Imathia regional unit, Central Macedonia
 Koryfi, Kozani, in the Kozani regional unit, Macedonia
 Koryfi, Trikala, a village in the Trikala regional unit, Thessaly
 Koryfi, Elis, in the Elis regional unit, Western Greece
 Koryfi, Florina, settlement in the Florina regional unit, Western Macedonia